Patella is a genus of sea snails with gills, typical true limpets, marine gastropod mollusks in the family Patellidae, the true limpets.

Patella is the type genus of the family Patellidae.

Species

Species within the genus Patella include:
 † Patella alessiae Forli, Dell'Angelo, Montagna & Taviani, 2004 
 † Patella alternicostata Sandberger, 1859 
 † Patella ambroggii Lecointre, 1952
 †Patella amuritica Wilckens, 1922 
 Patella argentaurum Lesson, 1831 (status in recent literature not researched by editor)
 Patella aspera Röding, 1798
 Patella caerulea Linnaeus, 1758
 Patella candei d'Orbigny, 1839
 Patella crocata R.P. Lesson, 1831
 Patella cyanea R.P. Lesson, 1831
 Patella depressa Pennant, 1777 - Patella depressa is a nomen dubium according to Christiaens (1973, 1983); Patella intermedia gets priority. Nevertheless the name Patella depressa is in usage among British authors (e.g. Graham, 1988) and is assumed as valid.
 Patella depsta Reeve, 1855: (taxon inquirendum)
 † Patella estotiensis Lozouet, 1999 
 Patella ferruginea Gmelin, 1791
 Patella gomesii Drouet, 1858
 † Patella hebertiana (d'Orbigny, 1850) 
 Patella lugubris Gmelin, 1791
 † Patella mahamensis Martín-González, 2018 
 † Patella matheyi De Loriol in De Loriol & Koby, 1890 
 † Patella maxoratensis Martín-González & Vera-Peláez, 2018 
 † Patella nelsonensis Trechmann, 1918 
 Patella ordinaria Mabille, 1888
 Patella pellucida Linnaeus, 1758
 Patella piperata Gould, 1846
 † Patella protea Doderlein, 1862 
 Patella rangiana Rochebrune, 1882
 Patella rustica Linnaeus, 1758
 Patella skelettensis Massier, 2009
 † Patella staceata Gründel, Hostettler & Menkveld-Gfeller, 2020 
 Patella swakopmundensis Massier, 2009
 Patella tenuis Gmelin, 1791
 † Patella tintina Martín-González & Vera-Peláez, 2018 
 Patella ulyssiponensis Gmelin, 1791 - synonyms: Patella aspera Lamarck, 1819; Patella athletica Bean, 1844
 Patella vulgata Linnaeus, 1758

Species brought into synonymy

 Patella achates Reeve, 1855: synonym of Acmaea achates (Reeve, 1855)
 Patella aculeata Gmelin, 1791: synonym of Bostrycapulus aculeatus (Gmelin, 1791)
 Patella adansonii Dunker, 1853: synonym of Cymbula safiana (Lamarck, 1819)
 Patella afra Gmelin, 1791: synonym of Trimusculus afer (Gmelin, 1791)
 Patella alba da Costa, 1771: synonym of Patella caerulea Linnaeus, 1758
 Patella alba Anton, 1838: synonym of Patella caerulea Linnaeus, 1758
 Patella albescens Philippi, 1846: synonym of Iothia albescens (Philippi, 1846)
 Patella albida Mörch, 1853: synonym of Cymbula nigra (da Costa, 1771): synonym of Cymbula safiana (Lamarck, 1819)
 Patella algira Deshayes, 1840: synonym of Cymbula nigra (da Costa, 1771): synonym of Cymbula safiana (Lamarck, 1819)
 Patella ambigua Dillwyn, 1817: synonym of Scutus anatinus (Donovan, 1820)
 Patella amoena Say, 1822: synonym of Testudinalia testudinalis (O. F. Müller, 1776)
 Patella amphitrite Turton, 1932: synonym of Scutellastra barbara (Linnaeus, 1758)
 Patella anatina Donovan, 1820: synonym of Scutus anatinus (Donovan, 1820)
 Patella ancyloides Forbes, 1840, non J de C Sowerby, 1824 and Patella exigua W. Thompson, 1844 are synonyms for Propilidium exiguum (W. Thompson, 1844)
 Patella apertura Montagu, 1803: synonym of Diodora graeca (Linnaeus, 1758)
 Patella aphanes Robson, 1986: synonym of Scutellastra aphanes (Robson, 1986)
 Patella araucana d'Orbigny, 1839: synonym of Scurria araucana (d'Orbigny, 1839)
 Patella ardosiaea Hombron & Jacquinot, 1841: synonym of Cellana ardosiaea (Hombron & Jacquinot, 1841)
 Patella argenvillei Krauss, 1848: synonym of Scutellastra argenvillei (Krauss, 1848) 
 Patella articulata Reeve, 1855: synonym of Cellana cylindrica (Gmelin, 1791)
 Patella aspera Lamarck, 1819: synonym of Patella ulyssiponensis Gmelin, 1791
 Patella aster Reeve, 1855 : synonym of Cellana rota (Gmelin, 1791)
 Patella athletica Bean, 1844: synonym of Patella ulyssiponensis Gmelin, 1791
 Patella auricola da Costa, 1771: synonym of Patella depressa Pennant, 1777
 Patella auricularia Lightfoot, 1786: synonym of Dolabella auricularia (Lightfoot, 1786)
 Patella australis Lamarck, 1819: synonym of Sabia conica (Schumacher, 1817)
 Patella axiaerata Verco, 1912: synonym of Asteracmea axiaerata (Verco, 1912)
 Patella azorica Nuttal in Jay, 1852: synonym of Patella ulyssiponensis Gmelin, 1791
 Patella barbara Linnaeus, 1758: synonym of Scutellastra barbara (Linnaeus, 1758)
 Patella barbata Lamarck, 1819: synonym of Scutellastra barbara (Linnaeus, 1758)
 Patella baudonii Drouet, 1858: synonym of Patella ulyssiponensis Gmelin, 1791
 Patella bifida Fischer von Waldheim, 1807: synonym of Scutellastra barbara (Linnaeus, 1758)
 Patella bimaculata Montagu, 1803: synonym of Ansates pellucida (Linnaeus, 1758): synonym of Patella pellucida Linnaeus, 1758
 Patella boninensis Pilsbry, 1891: synonym of Cellana mazatlandica (G. B. Sowerby I, 1839)
 Patella bonnardii Payraudeau, 1826: synonym of Patella ulyssiponensis Gmelin, 1791
 Patella borbonica Bory de Saint-Vincent, 1804: synonym of Septaria borbonica (Bory de Saint-Vincent, 1804)
 Patella caeca O. F. Müller, 1776: synonym of Lepeta caeca (O. F. Müller, 1776)
 Patella calamus Crosse & P. Fischer, 1864: synonym of Eoacmaea calamus (Crosse & P. Fischer, 1864)
 Patella calicula Li Chang, 1930: synonym of Patella caerulea Linnaeus, 1758
 Patella cancellata Risso, 1826: synonym of Patella caerulea Linnaeus, 1758
 Patella candeana d'Orbigny, 1847: synonym of Lottia antillarum G. B. Sowerby I, 1834
 Patella candida Couthouy, 1838: synonym of Lepeta caeca (O. F. Müller, 1776)
 Patella canescens Gmelin, 1791: synonym of Cymbula canescens (Gmelin, 1791)
 Patella capensis Gmelin, 1791: synonym of Cellana radiata (Born, 1778)
 Patella ceciliana (Orbigny, 1841): synonym of Scurria ceciliana (d'Orbigny, 1841)
 Patella cernica (H. Adams, 1869): synonym of Cellana livescens (Reeve, 1855)
 Patella chapmani Tenison-Woods, 1875: synonym of Scutellastra chapmani (Tenison-Woods, 1875)
 Patella chinensis Linnaeus, 1758: synonym of Calyptraea chinensis (Linnaeus, 1758)
 Patella chitonoides Reeve, 1854: synonym of Scutellastra exusta (Reeve, 1854)
 Patella cinnamomea Gould, 1846: synonym of Phenacolepas cinnamomea (Gould, 1846)
 Patella citrullus Gould, 1846: synonym of Patella candei d'Orbigny, 1839
 Patella clathratula Reeve, 1854: synonym of Cellana ardosiaea (Hombron & Jacquinot, 1841)
 Patella clealandi Fleming, 1828: synonym of Testudinalia testudinalis (O. F. Müller, 1776)
 Patella clypea Brown, 1827: synonym of Testudinalia testudinalis (O. F. Müller, 1776)
 Patella clypeater Lesson, 1831: synonym of Nacella clypeater (Lesson, 1831)
 Patella cochlear Born, 1778: synonym of Scutellastra cochlear (Born, 1778)
 Patella coeruleata da Costa, 1778: synonym of Ansates pellucida (Linnaeus, 1758): synonym of Patella pellucida Linnaeus, 1758
 Patella coffea (Reeve, 1855): synonym of Scurria variabilis (G. B. Sowerby I, 1839)
 Patella compressa Linnaeus, 1758: synonym of Cymbula compressa (Linnaeus, 1758)
 Patella concolor f. polygramma Tomlin, 1931: synonym of Helcion concolor (Krauss, 1848)
 Patella conica Anton, 1838: synonym of Patella vulgata Linnaeus, 1758
 Patella conspicua Philippi, 1849: synonym of Cymbula nigra (da Costa, 1771): synonym of Cymbula safiana (Lamarck, 1819)
 Patella cornea Helbling, 1779: synonym of Ansates pellucida (Linnaeus, 1758): synonym of Patella pellucida Linnaeus, 1758
 Patella costata Lesson, 1831: synonym of Fissurella costata Lesson, 1831
 Patella costosoplicata Mörch, 1853: synonym of Patella ferruginea Gmelin, 1791
 Patella crepidula Linnaeus, 1767: synonym of Crepidula unguiformis Lamarck, 1822
 Patella cretacea Reeve, 1854: synonym of Scutellastra flexuosa (Quoy & Gaimard, 1834)
 Patella cylindrica Gmelin, 1791: synonym of Cellana cylindrica (Gmelin, 1791)
 Patella cypria Gmelin, 1791: synonym of Patella ferruginea Gmelin, 1791
 Patella cypridium Perry, 1811: synonym of Ansates pellucida (Linnaeus, 1758): synonym of Patella pellucida Linnaeus, 1758
 Patella deflexa Helbling, 1779: synonym of Siphonaria deflexa (Helbling, 1779) (nomen dubium)
 † Patella deformis K. Martin, 1883: synonym of  † Cellana deformis (K. Martin, 1883) 
 Patella digitata Fischer von Waldheim, 1807: synonym of Scutellastra longicosta (Lamarck, 1819)
 Patella dilatata Lamarck, 1822: synonym of Crepipatella dilatata (Lamarck, 1822)
 Patella dira Reeve, 1855: synonym of Cellana dira (Reeve, 1855)
 Patella donacina Anton, 1838: synonym of Patella ulyssiponensis Gmelin, 1791
 Patella electrina Reeve, 1854: synonym of Patella depressa Pennant, 1777
 Patella emarginuloides Philippi, 1868: synonym of Iothia emarginuloides (Philippi, 1868)
 Patella enneagona Reeve, 1854: synonym of Cellana cylindrica (Gmelin, 1791)
 Patella equestris Linnaeus, 1758: synonym of Cheilea equestris (Linnaeus, 1758)
 Patella exigua Thompson W., 1844: synonym of Propilidium exiguum (W. Thompson, 1844)
 Patella extinctorium Turton, 1819: synonym of Pomatoceros triqueter (Linnaeus, 1758): synonym of Spirobranchus triqueter (Linnaeus, 1758)
 Patella exusta Reeve, 1854 and Patella pica Reeve, 1854 are synonyms for Scutellastra exusta (Reeve, 1854)
 Patella farquhari Turton, 1932: synonym of Helcion concolor (Krauss, 1848)
 Patella favaniana Risso, 1826: synonym of Patella caerulea Linnaeus, 1758
 Patella fissura Linnaeus, 1758: synonym of Emarginula fissura (Linnaeus, 1758)
 Patella flava Hutton, 1873: synonym of Cellana flava (Hutton, 1873)
 Patella flexuosa Quoy & Gaimard, 1834 and Patella stellaeformis Reeve, 1842 are synonyms for Scutellastra flexuosa (Quoy & Gaimard, 1834)
 Patella forbesi Smith J., 1839: synonym of Iothia fulva (O. F. Müller, 1776)
 Patella fornicata Linnaeus, 1758: synonym of Crepidula fornicata (Linnaeus, 1758)
 Patella fragilis Philippi, 1836: synonym of Patella caerulea Linnaeus, 1758
 Patella fraunfeldi Dunker, 1866: synonym of Patella piperata Gould, 1846
 Patella fulva O. F. Müller, 1776: synonym of Iothia fulva (O. F. Müller, 1776)
 Patella fungoides Da Costa, 1771: synonym of Scutellastra barbara (Linnaeus, 1758)
 Patella fusca Landt, 1800: synonym of Ansates pellucida (Linnaeus, 1758): synonym of Patella pellucida Linnaeus, 1758
 Patella galathea Lamarck, 1819: synonym of Phenacolepas galathea (Lamarck, 1819)
 Patella galeata Helbing, 1779: synonym of Diodora galeata (Helbing, 1779)
 Patella garconi Deshayes, 1863: synonym of Cellana livescens (Reeve, 1855)
 Patella goreensis Gmelin, 1791: synonym of Crepidula unguiformis Lamarck, 1822
 Patella gorgonica da Costa, 1771: synonym of Patella rustica Linnaeus, 1758
 Patella goudoti Mabille, 1888: synonym of Patella depressa Pennant, 1777
 Patella graeca Linnaeus, 1758: synonym of Diodora graeca (Linnaeus, 1758)
 Patella granatina: synonym of Cymbula granatina (Linnaeus, 1758)
 Patella granostriata Reeve, 1855: synonym of Cellana granostriata (Reeve, 1855)
 Patella granularis Linnaeus, 1758: synonym of Scutellastra granularis (Linnaeus, 1758)
 Patella grata Gould, 1859: synonym of Cellana grata (Gould, 1859)
 Patella grisea Risso, 1826: synonym of Patella caerulea Linnaeus, 1758
 Patella grisea de Blainville, 1825: synonym of Patella caerulea Linnaeus, 1758
 Patella guineensis Gmelin, 1791: synonym of Cymbula nigra (da Costa, 1771): synonym of Cymbula safiana (Lamarck, 1819)
 Patella guttata d'Orbigny, 1840: synonym of Patella piperata Gould, 1846
 Patella helena Turton, 1932: synonym of Helcion concolor (Krauss, 1848)
 Patella hellespontiana Monterosato, 1888: synonym of Patella caerulea Linnaeus, 1758
 Patella hepatica Prtichard & Gatliff, 1902: synonym of Patelloida victoriae (Gatliff & Gabriel, 1922)
 Patella hera Turton, 1932: synonym of Scutellastra barbara (Linnaeus, 1758)
 Patella hombroni Dautzenberg & Bouge, 1933: synonym of Cellana radiata orientalis (Pilsbry, 1891)
 Patella hypsilotera Locard, 1892: synonym of Patella vulgata Linnaeus, 1758
 Patella illuminata Gould, 1846: synonym of Cellana strigilis (Hombron & Jacquinot, 1841)
 Patella inconspicua Gray, 1843: synonym of Radiacmea inconspicua (Gray, 1843)
 Patella instabilis Gould, 1846: synonym of Lottia instabilis (Gould, 1846)
 Patella intermedia Murray in Knapp, 1857, black-footed limpet: synonym of Patella depressa Pennant, 1777
 Patella intorta Pennant, 1777: synonym of Ansates pellucida (Linnaeus, 1758): synonym of Patella pellucida Linnaeus, 1758
 Patella jamaicensis Gmelin, 1791: synonym of Lottia jamaicensis (Gmelin, 1791)
 Patella karachiensis Winckworth, 1930: synonym of Cellana rota (Gmelin, 1791)
 Patella kermadecensis: synonym of Scutellastra kermadecensis (Pilsbry, 1894)
 Patella kraussii Dunker, 1853: synonym of Cymbula nigra (da Costa, 1771): synonym of Cymbula safiana (Lamarck, 1819)
 Patella laciniosa Linnaeus, 1758: synonym of Siphonaria laciniosa (Linnaeus, 1758)
 Patella lacunosa Reeve, 1855: synonym of Scutellastra tabularis (Krauss, 1848)
 Patella lacustris Linnaeus, 1758: synonym of Acroloxus lacustris (Linnaeus, 1758)
 Patella laevigata Gmelin, 1791: synonym of Patella depressa Pennant, 1777
 Patella laevis Pennant, 1777: synonym of Patella pellucida Linnaeus, 1758
 Patella lamarckii Payraudeau, 1826: synonym of Patella ferruginea Gmelin, 1791
 Patella lamellata Röding, 1798: synonym of Scutellastra barbara (Linnaeus, 1758)
 Patella lampedusensis de Gregorio, 1884: synonym of Patella ferruginea Gmelin, 1791
 Patella laterocompressa de Rayneval & Ponzi, 1854: synonym of Lepetella laterocompressa (de Rayneval & Ponzi, 1854)
 Patella laticostata: synonym of Scutellastra laticostata (Blainville, 1825)
 Patella lepas Gmelin, 1791: synonym of Concholepas concholepas (Bruguière, 1789)
 Patella leucopleura Gmelin, 1791: synonym of Lottia leucopleura (Gmelin, 1791)
 Patella limatula Carpenter, 1864: synonym of Lottia limatula (Carpenter, 1864)
 Patella listeri Monterosato, 1888: synonym of Patella ulyssiponensis Gmelin, 1791
 Patella livescens Reeve, 1855: synonym of Cellana livescens (Reeve, 1855)
 Patella longicosta Lamarck, 1819: synonym of Scutellastra longicosta (Lamarck, 1819)
 Patella lowei d'Orbigny, 1839: synonym of Patella ulyssiponensis Gmelin, 1791
 Patella lusitanica Gmelin, 1791: synonym of Patella rustica Linnaeus, 1758
 Patella luteola Lamarck, 1819: synonym of Patella ferruginea Gmelin, 1791
 Patella mabillei Locard, 1892: synonym of Patella depressa Pennant, 1777
 Patella macroschisma Lightfoot, 1786: synonym of Macroschisma macroschisma (Lightfoot, 1786)
 Patella magellanica Gmelin, 1791: synonym of Nacella magellanica (Gmelin, 1791)
 Patella mamillata Risso, 1826: synonym of Trimusculus mammillaris (Linnaeus, 1758)
 Patella mammilaris Linnaeus, 1758: synonym of Trimusculus mammillaris (Linnaeus, 1758)
 Patella mammillaris Linnaeus, 1758: synonym of Trimusculus mammillaris (Linnaeus, 1758)
 Patella margaritacea Gmelin, 1791: synonym of Patella caerulea Linnaeus, 1758
 Patella mazatlandica G. B. Sowerby I, 1839: synonym of Cellana mazatlandica (G. B. Sowerby I, 1839)
 Patella medusa Röding, 1798: synonym of Patella ferruginea Gmelin, 1791
 Patella mexicana  Broderip, W.J. & G.B. I Sowerby, 1829: synonym of Scutellastra mexicana (Broderip & G. B. Sowerby I, 1829)
 Patella micans Röding, 1798: synonym of Cellana cylindrica (Gmelin, 1791)
 Patella militaris Linnaeus, 1771: synonym of Capulus ungaricus (Linnaeus, 1758)
 Patella miniata Born, 1778 and Patella sanguinans Reeve, 1854 are synonyms for Cymbula miniata (Born, 1778)
 Patella moreleti Drouet, 1858: synonym of Scutellastra flexuosa (Quoy & Gaimard, 1834)
 Patella moreli Deshayes, 1863: synonym of Scutellastra flexuosa (Quoy & Gaimard, 1834)
 Patella morio Noodt, 1819: synonym of Cellana radians (Gmelin, 1791)
 Patella muricata Brocchi, 1814: synonym of Calyptraea chinensis (Linnaeus, 1758)
 Patella mytiliformis Schroeter, 1786: synonym of Ansates pellucida (Linnaeus, 1758): synonym of Patella pellucida Linnaeus, 1758
 Patella mytilina Helbling, 1779: synonym of Nacella mytilina (Helbling, 1779)
 Patella nacrina de Gregorio, 1884: synonym of Patella caerulea Linnaeus, 1758
 Patella natalensis Krauss, 1848: synonym of Scutellastra natalensis (F. Krauss, 1848)
 Patella nigra da Costa, 1771 and Patella safiana Lamarck are synonyms for Cymbula nigra (da Costa, 1771)
 Patella nigrisquamata Reeve, 1854: synonym of Cellana mazatlandica (G. B. Sowerby I, 1839)
 Patella nigrolineata Reeve, 1854: synonym of Cellana nigrolineata (Reeve, 1854)
 Patella nigropunctata Reeve, 1854: synonym of Patella rustica Linnaeus, 1758
 Patella nigrosquamosa Dunker, 1846: synonym of Patella piperata Gould, 1846
 Patella noachina Linnaeus, 1771: synonym of Puncturella noachina (Linnaeus, 1771)
 Patella notata Linnaeus, 1758: synonym of Clypidina notata (Linnaeus, 1785)
 Patella novemradiata Quoy & Gaimard, 1834: synonym of Cellana livescens (Reeve, 1855)
 Patella nubecula Linnaeus, 1758: synonym of Fissurella nubecula (Linnaeus, 1758)
 Patella nympha Turton, 1932: synonym of Scutellastra barbara (Linnaeus, 1758)
 Patella obtecta Krauss, 1848: synonym of Scutellastra obtecta (Krauss, 1848)
 Patella octoradiata Gmelin, 1791: synonym of Hemitoma octoradiata (Gmelin, 1791)
 Patella octoradiata Hutton, 1873: synonym of Scutellastra chapmani (Tenison-Woods, 1875)
 Patella oculus: synonym of Cymbula oculus (Born, 1778)
 Patella oculuscati Noodt, 1819: synonym of Scutellastra granularis (Linnaeus, 1758)
 Patella oculushirci da Costa, 1771: synonym of Cymbula oculus (Born, 1778)
 Patella ombracula Blainville, 1819: synonym of Umbraculum umbraculum (Lightfoot, 1786)
 Patella opea Reeve, 1855: synonym of Lottia antillarum G. B. Sowerby I, 1834
 Patella orbignyana Nordsieck & Talavera, 1979: synonym of Patella ulyssiponensis Gmelin, 1791
 Patella pallida Gould, 1859: synonym of Niveotectura pallida (Gould, 1859)
 Patella parasitica (Orbigny, 1841): synonym of Scurria variabilis (G. B. Sowerby I, 1839)
 Patella parva Montagu, 1803: synonym of Tectura virginea (O.F. Müller, 1776)
 Patella patriarcha Pilsbry, 1891: synonym of Scutellastra tabularis (Krauss, 1848)
 Patella paulinoi Locard, 1894: synonym of Patella ulyssiponensis Gmelin, 1791
 Patella paumotensis Gould, 1846: synonym of Scutellastra flexuosa (Quoy & Gaimard, 1834)
 Patella pectinata Born, 1780: synonym of Siphonaria pectinata (Linnaeus, 1758)
 Patella penicillata (Reeve, 1855): synonym of Scurria variabilis (G. B. Sowerby I, 1839)
 Patella peronii: synonym of Scutellastra peronii (Blainville, 1825)
 Patella perversa Gmelin, 1791: synonym of Tylodina perversa (Gmelin, 1791)
 Patella pharaonis Jousseaume, 1888: synonym of Cellana rota (Gmelin, 1791)
 Patella pica Reeve, 1854: synonym of Scutellastra exusta (Reeve, 1854)
 Patella picta Gmelin, 1791: synonym of Fissurella picta (Gmelin, 1791)
 Patella plicaria Gmelin, 1791: synonym of Scutellastra barbara (Linnaeus, 1758)
 Patella plicata Born, 1778: synonym of Scutellastra barbara (Linnaeus, 1758)
 Patella plumbea Lamarck, 1819: synonym of Cymbula safiana (Lamarck, 1819)
 Patella polaris Hombron & Jacquinot, 1841: synonym of Nacella polaris (Hombron & Jacquinot, 1841)
 Patella poli Scacchi, 1832: synonym of Calyptraea chinensis (Linnaeus, 1758)
 Patella polita Risso, 1826: synonym of Patella rustica Linnaeus, 1758
 Patella pontica Valenciennes in Monterosato, 1888: synonym of Patella ulyssiponensis Gmelin, 1791
 Patella pontica Milaschewitsch, 1914: synonym of Patella ulyssiponensis Gmelin, 1791
 Patella porcellana Linnaeus, 1758: synonym of Septaria porcellana (Linnaeus, 1758)
 Patella pottsi Hutton, 1873: synonym of Cellana strigilis (Hombron & Jacquinot, 1841)
 Patella profunda Deshayes, 1863: synonym of Eoacmaea profunda (Deshayes, 1863)
 Patella pulchella Forbes, 1835: synonym of Tectura virginea (O. F. Müller, 1776)
 Patella pulcherrima Krebs, 1864: synonym of Lottia antillarum G. B. Sowerby I, 1834
 Patella punctata Lamarck, 1819: synonym of Patella rustica Linnaeus, 1758
 Patella punctulata Gmelin, 1791: synonym of Patella rustica Linnaeus, 1758
 Patella puncturata Lamarck, 1819: synonym of Eoacmaea pustulata (Helbling, 1779)
 Patella pustulata Helbling, 1779: synonym of Eoacmaea pustulata (Helbling, 1779)
 Patella pyramidata Lamarck, 1819: synonym of Patella ferruginea Gmelin, 1791
 Patella pyriformis da Costa, 1771: synonym of Scutellastra cochlear (Born, 1778)
 Patella radiata Born, 1778: synonym of Cellana radiata (Born, 1778)
 Patella radiata Perry, 1811: synonym of Patella vulgata Linnaeus, 1758
 Patella redimiculum Reeve, 1854: synonym of Cellana strigilis (Hombron & Jacquinot, 1841)
 Patella repanda Gmelin, 1791: synonym of Patella ulyssiponensis Gmelin, 1791
 Patella reticulata Donovan, 1803: synonym of Diodora graeca (Linnaeus, 1758)
 Patella richelmia Risso, 1826: synonym of Patella caerulea Linnaeus, 1758
 Patella rietensis Turton, 1932: synonym of Helcion concolor (Krauss, 1848)
 Patella riparia Nardo, 1847: synonym of Patella caerulea Linnaeus, 1758
 Patella rosea Gmelin, 1791: synonym of Fissurella nubecula (Linnaeus, 1758)
 Patella rota Gmelin, 1791: synonym of Cellana rota (Gmelin, 1791)
 Patella rouxii Payraudeau, 1826: synonym of Patella ferruginea Gmelin, 1791
 Patella rubella O. Fabricius, 1780: synonym of Erginus rubellus (O. Fabricius, 1780)
 Patella rudis Röding, 1798: synonym of Fissurella nodosa (Born, 1778)
 Patella safiana Lamarck, 1819: synonym of Cymbula safiana (Lamarck, 1819)
 Patella sagittata Gould, 1846: synonym of Cellana vitiensis Powell, 1973
 Patella sanguinans Reeve, 1854: synonym of Cymbula sanguinans (Reeve, 1854)
 Patella scapula Martyn, 1786: synonym of Dolabella auricularia (Lightfoot, 1786)
 Patella schrenckii Lischke, 1868: synonym of Nipponacmea schrenckii (Lischke, 1868)
 Patella scissa Salis Marschlins, 1793: synonym of Emarginula huzardii Payraudeau, 1826
 Patella scurra Lesson, 1831: synonym of Scurria scurra (Lesson, 1831)
 Patella scutellina Locard, 1892: synonym of Patella caerulea Linnaeus, 1758
 Patella scutellum Gmelin, 1791: synonym of Amblychilepas scutella [sic]: synonym of Dendrofissurella scutellum (Gmelin, 1791)
 Patella septemradiata Fischer von Waldheim, 1807: synonym of Cymbula granatina (Linnaeus, 1758)
 Patella serrata Fischer von Waldheim, 1807: synonym of Siphonaria serrata (Fischer von Waldheim, 1807)
 Patella silicina Röding, 1798: synonym of Patella caerulea Linnaeus, 1758
 Patella sinensis Gmelin, 1791: synonym of Calyptraea chinensis (Linnaeus, 1758)
 Patella sinica Gmelin, 1791: synonym of Umbraculum sinicum (Gmelin, 1791): synonym of Umbraculum umbraculum (Lightfoot, 1786)
 Patella sowerbyi Turton, 1932: synonym of Scutellastra barbara (Linnaeus, 1758)
 Patella spectabilis Dunker, 1853: synonym of Patella ulyssiponensis Gmelin, 1791
 Patella spinetum Röding, 1798: synonym of Scutellastra barbara (Linnaeus, 1758)
 Patella spinifera Lamarck, 1819: synonym of Scutellastra barbara (Linnaeus, 1758)
 Patella spinosa Fischer von Waldheim, 1807: synonym of Scutellastra barbara (Linnaeus, 1758)
 Patella spinosula Meuschen, 1787: synonym of Patella ulyssiponensis Gmelin, 1791
 Patella spinulosa Mörch, 1853: synonym of Patella ulyssiponensis Gmelin, 1791
 Patella squama de Blainville, 1825: synonym of Patella caerulea Linnaeus, 1758
 Patella squama Gmelin, 1791: synonym of Monia squama (Gmelin, 1791)
 Patella squamata Röding, 1798: synonym of Patella rustica Linnaeus, 1758
 Patella squamata Gmelin, 1791: synonym of Cymbula nigra (da Costa, 1771): synonym of Cymbula safiana (Lamarck, 1819)
 Patella stella Risso, 1826: synonym of Patella ferruginea Gmelin, 1791
 Patella stellaeformis Reeve, 1842: synonym of Scutellastra flexuosa (Quoy & Gaimard, 1834)
 Patella stellifera Gmelin, 1791: synonym of Cellana stellifera (Gmelin, 1791)
 Patella stellularia Quoy & Gaimard, 1834: synonym of Cellana stellifera (Gmelin, 1791)
 Patella strigilis Hombron & Jacquinot, 1841: synonym of Cellana strigilis (Hombron & Jacquinot, 1841)
 Patella subgranularis de Blainville, 1825: synonym of Patella rustica Linnaeus, 1758
 Patella subplana Potiez & Michaud, 1838: synonym of Patella caerulea Linnaeus, 1758
 Patella tabularis Krauss, 1848: synonym of Scutellastra tabularis (Krauss, 1848)
 Patella tahitica Curtiss, 1938: synonym of Cellana taitensis (Röding, 1798)
 Patella tara Prashad & Rao, 1934: synonym of Scutellastra flexuosa (Quoy & Gaimard, 1834)
 Patella tarentina Salis Marschlins, 1793: synonym of Patella ulyssiponensis Gmelin, 1791
 Patella taslei Mabille, 1888: synonym of Patella depressa Pennant, 1777
 Patella teneriffae Mabille, 1888: synonym of Patella ulyssiponensis Gmelin, 1791
 Patella tessellata Hombron & Jacquinot, 1841: synonym of Cellana radiata orientalis (Pilsbry, 1891)
 Patella tessulata O. F. Müller, 1776: synonym of Testudinalia testudinalis (O. F. Müller, 1776)
 Patella testudinalis O. F. Müller, 1776: synonym of Testudinalia testudinalis (O. F. Müller, 1776)
 Patella testudinaria Linnaeus, 1758: synonym of Cellana testudinaria (Linnaeus, 1758)
 Patella thetis Turton, 1932: synonym of Scutellastra barbara (Linnaeus, 1758)
 Patella toreuma Reeve, 1854: synonym of Cellana toreuma (Reeve, 1854)
 Patella tricarinata Linnaeus, 1767: synonym of Amathina tricarinata (Linnaeus, 1767)
 Patella tricornis Turton, 1819: synonym of Pomatoceros triqueter (Linnaeus, 1758): synonym of Spirobranchus triqueter (Linnaeus, 1758)
 Patella trigona Gmelin, 1791: synonym of Pilosabia trigona (Gmelin, 1791)
 Patella tucopiana: synonym of Scutellastra tucopiana Powell, 1925
 Patella turtonia Risso, 1826: synonym of Patella ferruginea Gmelin, 1791
 Patella umbraculum Lightfoot, 1786: synonym of Umbraculum umbraculum (Lightfoot, 1786)
 Patella umbrellata Delle Chiaje, 1830: synonym of Umbraculum umbraculum (Lightfoot, 1786)
 Patella undulata Röding, 1798: synonym of Cheilea undulata (Röding, 1798)
 Patella ungarica Linnaeus, 1758: synonym of Capulus ungaricus (Linnaeus, 1758)
 Patella unguis Linnaeus, 1758: synonym of Scutus unguis (Linnaeus, 1758)
 Patella variabilis (Reeve, 1855): synonym of Scurria variabilis (G. B. Sowerby I, 1839)
 Patella variabilis Krauss, 1848: synonym of Helcion concolor (Krauss, 1848)
 Patella variabilis Krauss, 1848: invalid: junior homonym of Patella variabilis Röding, 1798, and P. variabilis Risso, 1826; Patella fischeri is an unnecessary replacement name)
 Patella variabilis Risso, 1826: synonym of Patella rustica Linnaeus, 1758
 Patella variegata Reeve, 1842: synonym of Cellana rota (Gmelin, 1791)
 Patella variegata Reeve, 1854: synonym of Cellana eucosmia (Pilsbry, 1892)
 Patella vespertina Risso, 1826: synonym of Patella ferruginea Gmelin, 1791
 Patella victoriae Gatliff & Gabriel, 1922: synonym of Patelloida victoriae (Gatliff & Gabriel, 1922)
 Patella virgata Gmelin, 1791: synonym of Cellana radiata (Born, 1778)
 Patella virginea O. F. Müller, 1776: synonym of Tectura virginea (O. F. Müller, 1776)
 Patella viridula (Lamarck, 1819): synonym of Scurria viridula (Lamarck, 1822)
 Patella whitechurchi Turton, 1932: synonym of Scutellastra barbara (Linnaeus, 1758)
 Patella zebrina Lesson, 1831: synonym of Scurria zebrina (Lesson, 1831)

See also 
 Limpet

References
This article incorporates CC-BY-3.0 text from the reference.

External links
 Linnaeus, C. (1758). Systema Naturae per regna tria naturae, secundum classes, ordines, genera, species, cum characteribus, differentiis, synonymis, locis. Editio decima, reformata [10th revised edition, vol. 1: 824 pp. Laurentius Salvius: Holmiae]
 Sowerby, G. B., II (1839). A Conchological Manual. G. B. Sowerby, London, v, 130 pp., 24 pls
 Pallary, P. (1912). Catalogue des mollusques du littoral méditerranéen de l'Egypte. Mémoires de l'Institut d'Egypte. 7(3): 69-207, pls 15-18.
 Monterosato, T. A. di. (1884). Nomenclatura generica e specifica di alcune conchiglie mediterranee. Virzi, printed for the Author, Palermo, 152 pp.
 Christiaens J. (1973). Révision du genre Patella. Bulletin du Muséum National d'Histoire Naturelle de Paris (3)Zoologie 121: 1305-1392
 Powell, A. W. B. (1973). The patellid limpets of the world (Patellidae). Indo-Pacific Mollusca. 3(15): 75-206

Patellidae
Extant Eocene first appearances